Michael L. Fiegel is an American writer and game designer who has worked primarily on role-playing games.

Career

Role-playing games 
Fiegel was the columns editor for RPGnet from 2001 to 2005, as well as a columnist.

In 2001, Fiegel began working with Jerry Grayson of Khepera Publishing on the second edition of that company's GODSEND Agenda (2001), a realistic look at superheroes in the modern world . Fiegel later co-wrote and co-designed Khepera's HELLAS: Worlds of Sun and Stone (2008) alongside Grayson. He also wrote later books in the Hellas series.

Fiegel is also the creator of Ninja Burger and the author of the Ninja Burger RPG:2nd Edition (2006) and the Ninja Burger: Honorable Employee Handbook (2006). In 2009 he also wrote and published the modern horror/conspiracy-themed Vox RPG.

He also authored the Baba Yaga: The First Setting in Rassiya electronic RPG supplement for Dog Soul Publishing, which won a 2006 Gold ENnie award for Best Electronic Book and was nominated for Best Writing.

PC games 
Fiegel has worked as a writer for two MMORPGs: Perpetual Entertainment's Gods & Heroes: Rome Rising, and NCsoft's Aion: Assault on Balaurea. He was also the lead writer for the sci-fi-themed interactive fiction game The Away Team.

Books 
Outside of the already mentioned Ninja Burger: Honorable Employee Handbook (published by Kensington/Citadel in 2006), Fiegel's first novel titled Blackbird was published on November 14, 2017 by Skyhorse.

References

External links
 Home page
 Michael Fiegel :: Moby Games Database
 Mike "Aeon" Fiegel :: Pen & Paper RPG Database archive
 Michael Fiegel :: RPG Geek Website

21st-century American people
Living people
Place of birth missing (living people)
Role-playing game designers
Year of birth missing (living people)